The 2017 National People's Congress, or the Fifth Plenary Session of the 12th National People's Congress, was held in March 2017 at the Great Hall of the People in Beijing, China. It was the last plenary session of the 13th NPC held before elections the next year for the 13th National People's Congress.

At the NPC, Premier Li Keqiang announced an economic growth target of 6.5 percent for next year, the lowest growth target in two decades. Some observers argued that the target was too high yet due to China's growing debt problem, industrial overcapacity and economic maturing.

References

March 2017 events
2017 in China
National People's Congresses